Yellow Dog was an underground comix newspaper and later comic book published by the Print Mint in Berkeley, California. It published 22 issues from 1968 to 1973, featuring many of the period's most notable underground cartoonists, including Robert Crumb, Joel Beck, Robert Williams, Rick Griffin, Greg Irons, and Trina Robbins. Other frequent contributors included Andy Martin, Franz Cilensek, John Thompson, Buckwheat Florida, Jr., Jim Osborne, Ronald Lipking, and Hak Vogrin. The founding editor was Print Mint co-publisher Don Schencker.

Yellow Dog has the distinction of having published more issues than any other true underground comix publication.

Origins 
There is some disagreement about the impetus for Yellow Dog. Print Mint publisher/editor Don Schencker claims he came up with the idea, wanting to create an underground comix version of the old comics section of the Sunday newspaper. Cartoonist John Thompson claims that he and Joel Beck came up with the idea of a comix newspaper with the title "Puck the Yellow Kid" (a reference to Richard F. Outcault's' pioneering comics strip character The Yellow Kid). Thompson states that after some coaxing by the artists, Schencker agreed to publish the newspaper, but changed the name to Yellow Dog.

Publication history 
Yellow Dog started out as a tabloid-size fold-out newsprint broadsheet with black-and-white interiors featuring some yellow spot color. The first issue, published in May 1968, had eight pages, while issues #2–8 had 16 pages each. From issue #9–10 onward, Yellow Dog had at least 32 pages, most commonly running 44 pages long. With issue #13/#14 (July 1969), Yellow Dog switched format from a newspaper broadsheet to standard comic book size and format, with color covers and black-and-white interiors.

The first volume of Yellow Dog included seven issues, all published "as weekly as possible" in 1968. Vol. 2 began with issue #8 in 1969; eight issues were published that year, but three of those issues (#9/#10, #11/#12, and #13/#14) were double issues. Yellow Dog published two issues in 1970, two issues in 1971, three issues in 1972, and two issues in 1973. Yellow Dog ceased publishing after 22 issues, numbered 1-25 because of the three double issues.

The first twelve issues of Yellow Dog were reprinted in 1973 as a fifth anniversary edition, and sold together in a manila envelope.

Overview 
The "mascot" of the yellow dog — featured on almost all the covers — was intended to be a sort of underground analogue to Mad magazine's Alfred E. Neuman. The dog appeared on the cover of the first few 11 issues, portrayed as urinating on the leg of Captain Ahab from Moby-Dick. From issue #11 onward, the dog appeared in various places, sometimes part of the actual cover art, although it did not appear at all on issues #15, 18, and 19.

The first few issues of Yellow Dog offered little beyond drug-influenced vignettes, scatological humor, and some work by Robert Crumb. Crumb illustrated many covers for issues #1–13/14 (July 1969), which was the last issue to which he contributed. Highlights from issues #7–12 included Gilbert Shelton's Fabulous Furry Freak Brothers, Crumb's Mr. Natural, and strong contributions from Kim Deitch, and Skip Williamson. Issue #7 featured the first underground published work from Robert Williams.

The first comic-sized issue (#13/14, published in July 1969) featured contributions from  Crumb, Greg Irons, Jim Osborne, Larry Welz, Jay Lynch, Hak Vogrin, Kay Rudin, and S. Clay Wilson. As time passed, Yellow Dog became a showcase of sorts for new talent in the underground field, giving a forum to voices like Greg Irons, Justin Green, Trina Robbins, Bill Griffith, Robert Armstrong, and Howard Cruse.

Issues guide

Volume 1

Volume 2 
{| class="wikitable"
|-
! # !! Date !! Cover artist !! Contributors !! Notes
|-
| 8 || early 1969 || Robert Williams || Joel Beck, Robert Crumb, Buckwheat Florida Jr., Jon Gierlich, Rick Griffin, Andy Martin, Gilbert Shelton, Hak Vorging, Robert Williams, S. Clay Wilson ||
|-
| 9/10 || April 1969 || Robert Crumb || Peter Almasy, Robert Crumb, Kim Deitch, Buckwheat Florida Jr., Don Grant, Jay Lynch, Dave Manning, Andy Martin, Jim Osborne, Kent Perry, Kay Rudin, Bob Schnepf, Gilbert Shelton, John Thompson, Hak Vogrin, Robert Williams, S. Clay Wilson || Double-issue; Kay Rudin becomes Yellow Dog'''s first female contributor.
|-
| 11/12 || May 1969 || Skip Williamson || Peter Almasy, Joel Beck, Vaughn Bodē, Robert Crumb, Buckwheat Florida Jr., Justin Green, Ronald Lipking, Andy Martin, Jim Osborne, Kent Perry, Trina Robbins, Kay Rudin, Don Schenker, John Thompson, Hak Vogrin, Larry Welz, Skip Williamson, S. Clay Wilson || Double-issue
|-
| 13/14 || July 1969 || Robert Crumb || Greg Irons, Jim Osborne, Robert Crumb, Ronald Lipking, Larry Welz, Richard Carse, Jay Lynch, Hak Vogrin, Gill Smitherman, Kay Rudin, S. Clay Wilson, Andy Martin, Peter Almasy || Double-issue; switches format from tabloid to comics magazine.
|-
| 15 || Fall 1969 || Greg Irons || Rob Brown, Dan Clyne, Robert Dougherty, Renaud Facade, J. Gaccione, Jim Gardner, Justin Green, Greg Irons, Harvey Kurtzman, Ronald Lipking, Jay Lynch, Ed Newton, Hak Vogrin, Larry Welz || Special Harvey Kurtzman tribute issue, including a reprint of Kurtzman's 1959 12-page story "Compulsion on the Range".
|-
| 16 || Fall 1969 || Patrick Cosgrove || Joel Beck, Patrick Cosgrove, Fred Schrier, Hak Vogrin, Kincaid, Tripp Pollard, Ronald Lipking, John Thompson, Dan Clyne, Jim Gardner, J. Gaccione, Wink, Robert Dougherty ||
|-
| 17 || March 1970 || Larry Welz || Robert Dougherty, Larry Welz, George Metzger, Rick Shubb, Ronald Lipking, Greg Irons, Assid Mic, J. Gaccione, Justin Green, Gill Smitherson, Trina Robbins ||
|-
| 18 || November 1970 || Greg Irons || Greg Irons, Jim Evans, Jim Gardner, Patrick Cosgrove, Larry Welz, Roger Brand, Joel Beck, Bill Griffith, J. Freeman, J. Gaccione, John Thompson ||
|-
| 19 || March 1971 || Roger Brand || Greg Irons, Roger Brand, Justin Green, Fred Schrier, J. Gaccione, Bill Griffith, David Webster, Claude Bawls, Trina Robbins, Dave Sheridan, Luis Medina ||
|-
| 20 || July 1971 || Trina Robbins || Joe Roberts, Trina Robbins, Mervinius, Larry Rippee, Norman Quebedeau, Bill Griffith, Bob Riggs, Jim Gardner, D. Wood, David Webster, Greg Irons ||
|-
| 21 || January 1972 || Carl Lundgren || R. W. B., Joray, Tom Bird, Justin Green, Rebb C. King, Carl Lundgren, George Metzger, Hak Vogrin ||
|-
| 22 || 1972 || Greg Irons || Joel Beck, Mervinius, Justin Green, Greg Irons, Rebb C. King, Michael McMillan, Joe Roberts, Pat Ryan, Craig A. Stormon ||
|-
| 23 || October 1972 || Jim Evans || Robert Armstrong, Jim Evans, Willy Mendes, Marty Nelson, Chris Pelletiere, Trina Robbins, Carl Spann, D. Wood ||
|-
| 24 || March 1973 || Joe Roberts || Tim Boxell, Howard Cruse, Mervinius, Joe Roberts, Pat Ryan, R. Tomasic, D. Wood ||
|-
| 25 || Fall 1973|| Trina Robbins || Joel Beck, Leslie Cabarga, Robert Cavey, Patrick Cosgrove, Dave Hereth, Rick Pflug, Trina Robbins, Joe Roberts ||
|}

 See also 
 Gothic Blimp Works''

Notes

References 
 
 

1968 comics debuts
1973 comics endings
Comics anthologies 
Underground comix
San Francisco Bay Area literature
Culture of Berkeley, California
Comics magazines published in the United States
Magazines established in 1968
Magazines disestablished in 1973